White Girl may refer to:
A caucasian female
Slang for cocaine
Symphony in White, No. 1: The White Girl, a painting by James Whistler

Film and TV
The White Girl (1990 film), a 1990 American film
White Girl (2008 film), a 2008 British film
White Girl (2016 film), a 2016 American film
The White Girl (2017 film), a 2017 Hong Kong film directed by Jenny Suen and Christopher Doyle

Music
"White Girl" (song), a 2007 song by hip hop group U.S.D.A.
"White Girl", song by Lil Wayne from Free Weezy Album 2015
"White Girl", song by Lari White from My First Affair
"White Girl", song by Trina from Amazin'
"White Girl", song by Lil Peep from Come Over When You're Sober, Pt. 2 
"White Girl", song by Johnny Cash Bitter Tears: Ballads of the American Indian
"White Girl", song by Soul Coughing from Irresistible Bliss

See also
 Symphony in White, No. 2: The Little White Girl
 White Girls, a 2013 book by Hilton Als
 White Girl Bleed a Lot, a 2012 book
 Black Girl / White Girl, a 2006 book by Joyce Carol Oates
 White Chicks, 2004 American film